Pseudartabotrys is a monotypic genus of flowering plants belonging to the family Annonaceae. The only species is Pseudartabotrys letestui.

Its native range is Western Central Tropical Africa.

References

Annonaceae
Annonaceae genera
Monotypic magnoliid genera